
Year 554 (DLIV) was a common year starting on Thursday (link will display the full calendar) of the Julian calendar. The denomination 554 for this year has been used since the early medieval period, when the Anno Domini calendar era became the prevalent method in Europe for naming years.

Events 
 By place 
 Byzantine Empire 
 August 13 – Byzantine Emperor Justinian I issues a pragmatic sanction reorganizing Italy, and rewards the praetorian prefect Liberius for over 60 years of distinguished service, granting him extensive estates in Italy.
 August 15 – The 554 Anatolia earthquake takes place in the southwest coasts of Anatolia (Asia Minor). It affects the Güllük Gulf (Mandalya Gulf), and the island of Kos.
 October – Battle of the Volturnus: In the spring Butilinus (Buccelin) has marched north; the Frankish army (infected by an epidemic of dysentery which kills their leader Leutharis (Lothair)) is reduced to about 30,000 men. The Byzantine army, with 18,000 men (including a contingent of Goths under Aligern), marches south to meet them at Casilinum (on the banks of the River Volturno). Byzantine eunuch general Narses sends a cavalry force under Chanaranges to destroy the supply wagons of the Franks. Outmanoeuvring Butilinus, he chooses a disposition similar to that at Taginae. After a frontal assault on the Byzantine centre, the Franks and the Alamanni are annihilated, thus effectively ending the Gothic War (535–554). Narses garrisons an army of 16,000 men in Italy. The recovery of the Italian Peninsula has cost the empire about 300,000 pounds of gold.

 Europe 
 Byzantine forces under Liberius seize Granada (Andalusia) and occupy the old province of Baetica. Justinian I calls Belisarius out of retirement, to complete the consolidation of reconquered regions of Southern Spain.
 Athanagild is crowned as king of the Visigoths and succeeds Agila I. He acknowledges the suzerainty of the Byzantine Empire.

 Asia 
 Al-Mundhir III ibn al-Nu'man is defeated and killed by the Ghassanids under al-Harith ibn Jabalah, at the battle of Yawm Halima; 'Amr III ibn al-Mundhir succeeds as king of the Lakhmids.
 Gong Di succeeds his brother Fei Di as emperor of Western Wei. He is deposed by general Yuwen Tai who puts him to death.  
 The province of Jiangling (Central China) is captured; 100,000 inhabitants are enslaved and distributed to generals and officials.
 Wei Shou completes compilation of the Book of Wei.
 Baekje and the Gaya Confederacy wage war upon Silla, one of the Three Kingdoms of Korea, but are defeated.
 Wideok becomes king of the Korean kingdom of Baekje.
 Muqan Qaghan succeeds his brother Issik Qaghan as emperor (khagan) of the Göktürks. 
 The second and larger of the two Buddhas of Bamyan is erected in central Afghanistan.

 By topic 
 Religion 
 Cassiodorus, Roman statesman, founds the Monastery at Vivarium (approximate date).

Births 
exact date unknown
Fei (Chen Bozong), emperor of the Chen Dynasty (d. 570)
Suiko, empress of Japan (d. 628)
probable Wendelin of Trier, Germanic hermit and abbot

Deaths 
March - Agila I, king of the Visigoths
exact date unknown
Al-Mundhir III ibn al-Nu'man, king of the Lakhmids (Iraq) 
Fei Di (Yuan Qin), emperor of Western Wei
Mermeroes, Persian general
Seong, king of Baekje (Korea)
probable
Liberius, Roman aristocrat
Yuwen, empress of Western Wei

References

Sources